Desmiphoropsis is a genus of longhorn beetles of the subfamily Lamiinae.

 Desmiphoropsis mannerheimi (Thomson, 1865)
 Desmiphoropsis variegata (Audinet-Serville, 1835)

References

Compsosomatini